Dibrugarh Dental College is a government dental college of Assam. It was established in 2018 by Government of Assam.

The college offers 4.5 year full-time degree course of Bachelor of Dental Surgery (BDS). The college is affiliated under  Srimanta Sankaradeva University of Health Sciences.
Dibrugarh Dental College is recognized by Dental Council of India.

Academics
The college offers 5year full-time undergraduate degree course of Bachelor of Dental Surgery. The admission into the BDS course is based on NEET. All the courses are under Srimanta Sankaradeva University of Health Sciences.

Courses
 Bachelor of Dental Surgery – 63 seats per year

References

Affiliates of Srimanta Sankaradeva University of Health Sciences
Dental colleges in India
Medical colleges in Assam
Educational institutions established in 2018
2018 establishments in Assam